= Piazza degli Affari =

- Square
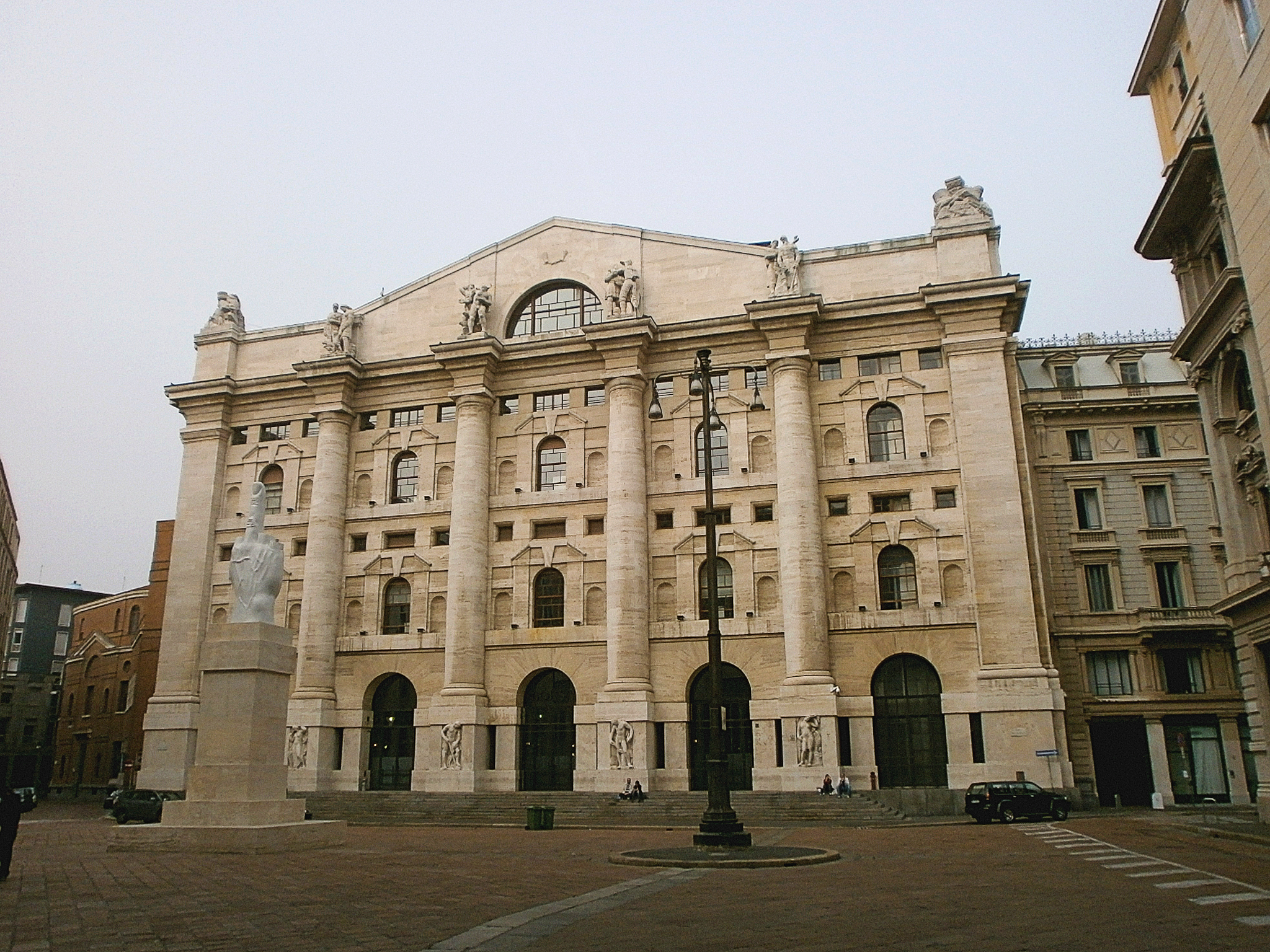
- Location: Milan, Italy
- Interactive map of Piazza degli Affari

Piazza degli Affari is a square in Milan, Italy.
